Harter may refer to:

Harter (surname)
Harter Township, Clay County, Illinois, township in Illinois, United States
Harter, West Virginia, unincorporated community in West Virginia, United States
Harter Fell (disambiguation)
Harter Nunatak, nunatak of Antarctica